The National Academy of Marine Research (NAMR) a research institute of Taiwan dealing with ocean-related policy planning, research and marine industries development.

History
The research institute was inaugurated by Vice Premier Chen Chi-mai on 24 April 2019.

Director-Generals
 Chiu Yung-fang (24 April 2019-) (acting)

See also
 Geography of Taiwan
 Maritime industries of Taiwan

References

External links
 

2019 establishments in Taiwan
Executive Yuan
Government agencies established in 2019
Oceanographic organizations
Organizations based in Kaohsiung
Research institutes in Taiwan
Research institutes established in 2019